Egton is a railway station on the Esk Valley Line, which runs between Middlesbrough and Whitby via Nunthorpe. It is owned by Network Rail and managed by Northern Trains.

History

Between 1865 and 1881, the station was known as Egton after the bigger of the two villages it served, but between 1881 and 1892, it was called Egton Bridge named after its physical location. It reverted to being plain Egton in 1892.

The station stopped forwarding and receiving goods in August 1965.

Services

As of the May 2021 timetable change, the station is served by five trains per day (four on Sunday) towards Whitby. Heading towards Middlesbrough via Nunthorpe, there are six trains per day (four on Sunday). Most trains continue to Newcastle via Hartlepool. All services are operated by Northern Trains.

Rolling stock used: Class 156 Super Sprinter and Class 158 Express Sprinter

References

External links
 
 

Railway stations in the Borough of Scarborough
DfT Category F2 stations
Former North Eastern Railway (UK) stations
Railway stations in Great Britain opened in 1865
Northern franchise railway stations